Anglo-Saxon England or Early Medieval England, existing from the 5th to the 11th centuries from the end of Roman Britain until the Norman conquest in 1066, consisted of various Anglo-Saxon kingdoms until 927, when it was united as the Kingdom of England by King Æthelstan (r. 927–939). It became part of the short-lived North Sea Empire of Cnut the Great, a personal union between England, Denmark and Norway in the 11th century.

The Anglo-Saxons migrated to England from mainland northwestern Europe after the Roman Empire abandoned Britain at the beginning of the fifth century. Anglo-Saxon history thus begins during the period of sub-Roman Britain following the end of Roman control, and traces the establishment of Anglo-Saxon kingdoms in the 5th and 6th centuries (conventionally identified as seven main kingdoms: Northumbria, Mercia, East Anglia, Essex, Kent, Sussex, and Wessex); their Christianisation during the 7th century; the threat of Viking invasions and Danish settlers; the gradual unification of England under the Wessex hegemony during the 9th and 10th centuries; and ending with the Norman conquest of England by William the Conqueror in 1066.

Anglo-Saxon identity survived beyond the Norman conquest, came to be known as Englishry under Norman rule, and through social and cultural integration with Celts, Danes and Normans became the modern English people.

Terminology 
Bede completed his book Historia ecclesiastica gentis Anglorum (Ecclesiastical History of the English People) in around 731. Thus, the term for English people (Latin: gens Anglorum; Old English: Angelcynn) was in use by then to distinguish Germanic groups in Britain from those on the continent (Old Saxony in Northern Germany). The term 'Anglo-Saxon' came into use in the 8th century (probably by Paul the Deacon) to distinguish English Saxons from continental Saxons (Ealdseaxan, 'old' Saxons).

The historian James Campbell suggested that it was not until the late Anglo-Saxon period that England could be described as a nation state. It is certain that the concept of "Englishness" only developed very slowly.

Historical context 

As the Roman occupation of Britain was coming to an end, Constantine III withdrew the remains of the army in reaction to the Germanic invasion of Gaul with the Crossing of the Rhine in December 406. The Romano-British leaders were faced with an increasing security problem from seaborne raids, particularly by Picts on the east coast of England. The expedient adopted by the Romano-British leaders was to enlist the help of Anglo-Saxon mercenaries (known as ), to whom they ceded territory. In about 442 the Anglo-Saxons mutinied, apparently because they had not been paid. The Romano-British responded by appealing to the Roman commander of the Western empire, Aëtius, for help (a document known as the Groans of the Britons), even though Honorius, the Western Roman Emperor, had written to the British  in or about 410 telling them to look to their own defence. There then followed several years of fighting between the British and the Anglo-Saxons. The fighting continued until around 500, when, at the Battle of Mount Badon, the Britons inflicted a severe defeat on the Anglo-Saxons.

Migration and the formation of kingdoms (400–600) 

There are records of Germanic infiltration into Britain that date before the collapse of the Roman Empire. It is believed that the earliest Germanic visitors were eight cohorts of Batavians attached to the 14th Legion in the original invasion force under Aulus Plautius in AD 43. There is a recent hypothesis that some of the native tribes, identified as Britons by the Romans, may have been Germanic-language speakers, but most scholars disagree with this due to an insufficient record of local languages in Roman-period artefacts.

It was quite common for Rome to swell its legions with foederati recruited from the German homelands. This practice also extended to the army serving in Britain, and graves of these mercenaries, along with their families, can be identified in the Roman cemeteries of the period. The migration continued with the departure of the Roman army, when Anglo-Saxons were recruited to defend Britain; and also during the period of the Anglo-Saxon first rebellion of 442.

If the Anglo-Saxon Chronicle is to be believed, the various Anglo-Saxon kingdoms which eventually merged to become England were founded when small fleets of three or five ships of invaders arrived at various points around the coast of England to fight the sub-Roman British, and conquered their lands. The language of the migrants, Old English, came over the next few centuries to predominate throughout what is now England, at the expense of British Celtic and British Latin.

The arrival of the Anglo-Saxons into Britain can be seen in the context of a general movement of Germanic peoples around Europe between the years 300 and 700, known as the Migration period (also called the Barbarian Invasions or Völkerwanderung). In the same period there were migrations of Britons to the Armorican peninsula (Brittany and Normandy in modern-day France): initially around 383 during Roman rule, but also c. 460 and in the 540s and 550s; the 460s migration is thought to be a reaction to the fighting during the Anglo-Saxon mutiny between about 450 to 500, as was the migration to Britonia (modern day Galicia, in northwest Spain) at about the same time.

The historian Peter Hunter-Blair expounded what is now regarded as the traditional view of the Anglo-Saxon arrival in Britain. He suggested a mass immigration, with the incomers fighting and driving the sub-Roman Britons off their land and into the western extremities of the islands, and into the Breton and Iberian peninsulas. This view is based on sources such as Bede, who mentions the Britons being slaughtered or going into "perpetual servitude". According to Härke
the more modern view is of co-existence between the British and the Anglo-Saxons. He suggests that several modern archaeologists have now re-assessed the traditional model, and have developed a co-existence model largely based on the Laws of Ine. The laws include several clauses that provide six different wergild levels for the Britons, of which four are below that of freeman. Although it was possible for the Britons to be rich freemen in Anglo-Saxon society, generally it seems that they had a lower status than that of the Anglo-Saxons.

Discussions and analysis still continue on the size of the migration, and whether it was a small elite band of Anglo-Saxons who came in and took over the running of the country, or a mass migration of peoples who overwhelmed the Britons. An emerging view is that two scenarios could have co-occurred, with large-scale migration and demographic change in the core areas of the settlement and elite dominance in peripheral regions.

According to Gildas, initial vigorous British resistance was led by a man called Ambrosius Aurelianus, from which time victory fluctuated between the two peoples. Gildas records a "final" victory of the Britons at the Battle of Mount Badon in c. 500, and this might mark a point at which Anglo-Saxon migration was temporarily stemmed. Gildas said that this battle was "forty-four years and one month" after the arrival of the Saxons, and was also the year of his birth. He said that a time of great prosperity followed. But, despite the lull, the Anglo-Saxons took control of Sussex, Kent, East Anglia and part of Yorkshire; while the West Saxons founded a kingdom in Hampshire under the leadership of Cerdic, around 520. However, it was to be 50 years before the Anglo-Saxons began further major advances. In the intervening years the Britons exhausted themselves with civil war, internal disputes, and general unrest, which was the inspiration behind Gildas's book De Excidio Britanniae (The Ruin of Britain).

The next major campaign against the Britons was in 577, led by Ceawlin, king of Wessex, whose campaigns succeeded in taking Cirencester, Gloucester and Bath (known as the Battle of Dyrham). This expansion of Wessex ended abruptly when the Anglo-Saxons started fighting among themselves and resulted in Ceawlin retreating to his original territory. He was then replaced by Ceol (who was possibly his nephew). Ceawlin was killed the following year, but the annals do not specify by whom. Cirencester subsequently became an Anglo-Saxon kingdom under the overlordship of the Mercians, rather than Wessex.

Heptarchy and Christianisation (7th and 8th centuries) 

By 600, a new order was developing, of kingdoms and sub-Kingdoms. The medieval historian Henry of Huntingdon conceived the idea of the Heptarchy, which consisted of the seven principal Anglo-Saxon kingdoms (Heptarchy literal translation from the Greek: hept – seven; archy – rule).

By convention, the Heptarchy period lasted from the end of Roman rule in Britain in the 5th century, until most of the Anglo-Saxon kingdoms came under the overlordship of Egbert of Wessex in 829. This approximately 400-year period of European history is often referred to as the Early Middle Ages or, more controversially, as the Dark Ages.
Although heptarchy suggests the existence of seven kingdoms, the term is just used as a label of convenience and does not imply the existence of a clear-cut or stable group of seven kingdoms. The number of kingdoms and sub-kingdoms fluctuated rapidly during this period as competing kings contended for supremacy.

Anglo-Saxon England heptarchy 
The four main kingdoms in Anglo-Saxon England were:
 East Anglia
 Mercia
 Northumbria, including sub-kingdoms Bernicia and Deira
 Wessex

Minor kingdoms:
 Essex
 Kent
 Sussex

Other minor kingdoms and territories 
 Haestingas
 Hwicce
 Kingdom of the Iclingas, a precursor state to Mercia
 Isle of Wight, (Wihtwara)
 Lindsey
 Magonsæte
 Meonwara, the Meon Valley area of Hampshire
 Pecsæte
 Surrey
 Tomsæte
 Wreocensæte

At the end of the 6th century the most powerful ruler in England was Æthelberht of Kent, whose lands extended north to the River Humber. In the early years of the 7th century, Kent and East Anglia were the leading English kingdoms. After the death of Æthelberht in 616, Rædwald of East Anglia became the most powerful leader south of the Humber.

Following the death of Æthelfrith of Northumbria, Rædwald provided military assistance to the Deiran Edwin in his struggle to take over the two dynasties of Deira and Bernicia in the unified kingdom of Northumbria. Upon the death of Rædwald, Edwin was able to pursue a grand plan to expand Northumbrian power.

The growing strength of Edwin of Northumbria forced the Anglo-Saxon Mercians under Penda into an alliance with the Welsh King Cadwallon ap Cadfan of Gwynedd, and together they invaded Edwin's lands and defeated and killed him at the Battle of Hatfield Chase in 633. Their success was short-lived, as Oswald (one of the sons of the late King of Northumbria, Æthelfrith) defeated and killed Cadwallon at Heavenfield near Hexham. In less than a decade Penda again waged war against Northumbria, and killed Oswald in the Battle of Maserfield in 642.

His brother Oswiu was chased to the northern extremes of his kingdom. However, Oswiu killed Penda shortly after, and Mercia spent the rest of the 7th and all of the 8th century fighting the kingdom of Powys. The war reached its climax during the reign of Offa of Mercia, who is remembered for the construction of a 150-mile-long dyke which formed the Wales/England border. It is not clear whether this was a boundary line or a defensive position. The ascendency of the Mercians came to an end in 825, when they were soundly beaten under Beornwulf at the Battle of Ellendun by Egbert of Wessex.

Christianity had been introduced into the British Isles during the Roman occupation. The early Christian Berber author, Tertullian, writing in the 3rd century, said that "Christianity could even be found in Britain." The Roman Emperor Constantine (306–337), granted official tolerance to Christianity with the Edict of Milan in 313. Then, in the reign of Emperor Theodosius "the Great" (378–395), Christianity was made the official religion of the Roman Empire.

It is not entirely clear how many Britons would have been Christian when the pagan Anglo-Saxons arrived. There had been attempts to evangelise the Irish by Pope Celestine I in 431. However, it was Saint Patrick who is credited with converting the Irish en-masse. A Christian Ireland then set about evangelising the rest of the British Isles, and Columba was sent to found a religious community in Iona, off the west coast of Scotland. Then Aidan was sent from Iona to set up his see in Northumbria, at Lindisfarne, between 635 and 651. Hence Northumbria was converted by the Celtic (Irish) church.

Bede is very uncomplimentary about the indigenous British clergy: in his Historia ecclesiastica he complains of their "unspeakable crimes", and that they did not preach the faith to the Angles or Saxons. Pope Gregory I sent Augustine in 597 to convert the Anglo-Saxons, but Bede says the British clergy refused to help Augustine in his mission. Despite Bede's complaints, it is now believed that the Britons played an important role in the conversion of the Anglo-Saxons. On arrival in the south east of England in 597, Augustine was given land by King Æthelberht of Kent to build a church; so in 597 Augustine built the church and founded the See at Canterbury. Æthelberht was baptised by 601, and he then continued with his mission to convert the English. Most of the north and east of England had already been evangelised by the Irish Church. However, Sussex and the Isle of Wight remained mainly pagan until the arrival of Saint Wilfrid, the exiled Archbishop of York, who converted Sussex around 681 and the Isle of Wight in 683.

It remains unclear what "conversion" actually meant. The ecclesiastical writers tended to declare a territory as "converted" merely because the local king had agreed to be baptised, regardless of whether, in reality, he actually adopted Christian practices; and regardless, too, of whether the general population of his kingdom did. When churches were built, they tended to include pagan as well as Christian symbols, evidencing an attempt to reach out to the pagan Anglo-Saxons, rather than demonstrating that they were already converted.

Even after Christianity had been set up in all of the Anglo-Saxon kingdoms, there was friction between the followers of the Roman rites and the Irish rites, particularly over the date on which Easter fell and the way monks cut their hair. In 664 a conference was held at Whitby Abbey (known as the Whitby Synod) to decide the matter; Saint Wilfrid was an advocate for the Roman rites and Bishop Colmán for the Irish rites. Wilfrid's argument won the day and Colmán and his party returned to Ireland in their bitter disappointment. The Roman rites were adopted by the English church, although they were not universally accepted by the Irish Church until Henry II of England invaded Ireland in the 12th century and imposed the Roman rites by force.

Viking challenge and the rise of Wessex (9th century) 

Between the 8th and 11th centuries, raiders and colonists from Scandinavia, mainly Danish and Norwegian, plundered western Europe, including the British Isles. These raiders came to be known as the Vikings; the name is believed to derive from Scandinavia, where the Vikings originated. The first raids in the British Isles were in the late 8th century, mainly on churches and monasteries (which were seen as centres of wealth). The Anglo-Saxon Chronicle reports that the holy island of Lindisfarne was sacked in 793. The raiding then virtually stopped for around 40 years; but in about 835, it started becoming more regular.

In the 860s, instead of raids, the Danes mounted a full-scale invasion. In 865, an enlarged army arrived that the Anglo-Saxons described as the Great Heathen Army. This was reinforced in 871 by the Great Summer Army. Within ten years nearly all of the Anglo-Saxon kingdoms fell to the invaders: Northumbria in 867, East Anglia in 869, and nearly all of Mercia in 874–77. Kingdoms, centres of learning, archives, and churches all fell before the onslaught from the invading Danes. Only the Kingdom of Wessex was able to survive. In March 878, the Anglo-Saxon King of Wessex, Alfred, with a few men, built a fortress at Athelney, hidden deep in the marshes of Somerset. He used this as a base from which to harry the Vikings. In May 878 he put together an army formed from the populations of Somerset, Wiltshire, and Hampshire, which defeated the Viking army in the Battle of Edington. The Vikings retreated to their stronghold, and Alfred laid siege to it. Ultimately the Danes capitulated, and their leader Guthrum agreed to withdraw from Wessex and to be baptised. The formal ceremony was completed a few days later at Wedmore. There followed a peace treaty between Alfred and Guthrum, which had a variety of provisions, including defining the boundaries of the area to be ruled by the Danes (which became known as the Danelaw) and those of Wessex. The Kingdom of Wessex controlled part of the Midlands and the whole of the South (apart from Cornwall, which was still held by the Britons), while the Danes held East Anglia and the North.

After the victory at Edington and resultant peace treaty, Alfred set about transforming his Kingdom of Wessex into a society on a full-time war footing. He built a navy, reorganised the army, and set up a system of fortified towns known as burhs. He mainly used old Roman cities for his burhs, as he was able to rebuild and reinforce their existing fortifications. To maintain the burhs, and the standing army, he set up a taxation system known as the Burghal Hidage. These burhs (or burghs) operated as defensive structures. The Vikings were thereafter unable to cross large sections of Wessex: the Anglo-Saxon Chronicle reports that a Danish raiding party was defeated when it tried to attack the burh of Chichester.

Although the burhs were primarily designed as defensive structures, they were also commercial centres, attracting traders and markets to a safe haven, and they provided a safe place for the king's moneyers and mints. A new wave of Danish invasions commenced in 891, beginning a war that lasted over three years. Alfred's new system of defence worked, however, and ultimately it wore the Danes down: they gave up and dispersed in mid-896.

Alfred is remembered as a literate king. He or his court commissioned the Anglo-Saxon Chronicle, which was written in Old English (rather than in Latin, the language of the European annals). Alfred's own literary output was mainly of translations, but he also wrote introductions and amended manuscripts.

English unification (10th century) 

From 874 to 879 the western half of Mercia was ruled by Ceowulf II, who was succeeded by Æthelred as Lord of the Mercians. Alfred the Great of Wessex styled himself King of the Anglo-Saxons from about 886. In 886/887 Æthelred married Alfred's daughter Æthelflæd. On Alfred's death in 899, his son Edward the Elder succeeded him.

When Æthelred died in 911, Æthelflæd succeeded him as "Lady of the Mercians", and in the 910s she and her brother Edward recovered East Anglia and eastern Mercia from Viking rule. Edward and his successors expanded Alfred's network of fortified burhs, a key element of their strategy, enabling them to go on the offensive. When Edward died in 924 he ruled all England south of the Humber. His son, Æthelstan, annexed Northumbria in 927 and thus became the first king of all England. At the Battle of Brunanburh in 937, he defeated an alliance of the Scots, Danes, and Vikings and Strathclyde Britons.

Along with the Britons and the settled Danes, some of the other Anglo-Saxon kingdoms disliked being ruled by Wessex. Consequently, the death of a Wessex king would be followed by rebellion, particularly in Northumbria. Alfred's great-grandson, Edgar, who had come to the throne in 959, was crowned at Bath in 973 and soon afterwards the other British kings met him at Chester and acknowledged his authority.

The presence of Danish and Norse settlers in the Danelaw had a lasting impact; the people there saw themselves as "armies" a hundred years after settlement: King Edgar issued a law code in 962 that was to include the people of Northumbria, so he addressed it to Earl Olac "and all the army that live in that earldom". There are over 3,000 words in modern English that have Scandinavian roots, and more than 1,500 place-names in England are Scandinavian in origin; for example, topographic names such as Howe, Norfolk and Howe, North Yorkshire are derived from the Old Norse word haugr meaning hill, knoll, or mound. In archaeology and other academic contexts the term Anglo-Scandinavian is often used for Scandinavian culture in England.

England under the Danes and the Norman conquest (978–1066) 

Edgar died in 975, sixteen years after gaining the throne, while still only in his early thirties. Some magnates supported the succession of his younger son, Æthelred, but his elder half-brother, Edward was elected, aged about twelve. His reign was marked by disorder, and three years later, in 978, he was assassinated by some of his half-brother's retainers. Æthelred succeeded, and although he reigned for thirty-eight years, one of the longest reigns in English history, he earned the name "Æthelred the Unready", as he proved to be one of England's most disastrous kings. William of Malmesbury, writing in his Chronicle of the kings of England about one hundred years later, was scathing in his criticism of Æthelred, saying that he occupied the kingdom, rather than governed it.

Just as Æthelred was being crowned, the Danish King Gormsson was trying to force Christianity onto his domain. Many of his subjects did not like this idea, and shortly before 988, Swein, his son, drove his father from the kingdom. The rebels, dispossessed at home, probably formed the first waves of raids on the English coast. The rebels did so well in their raiding that the Danish kings decided to take over the campaign themselves.

In 991 the Vikings sacked Ipswich, and their fleet made landfall near Maldon in Essex. The Danes demanded that the English pay a ransom, but the English commander Byrhtnoth refused; he was killed in the ensuing Battle of Maldon, and the English were easily defeated. From then on the Vikings seem to have raided anywhere at will; they were contemptuous of the lack of resistance from the English. Even the Alfredian systems of burhs failed. Æthelred seems to have just hidden, out of range of the raiders.

Payment of Danegeld 
By the 980s the kings of Wessex had a powerful grip on the coinage of the realm. It is reckoned there were about 300 moneyers, and 60 mints, around the country. Every five or six years the coinage in circulation would cease to be legal tender and new coins were issued. The system controlling the currency around the country was extremely sophisticated; this enabled the king to raise large sums of money if needed. The need indeed arose after the battle of Maldon, as Æthelred decided that, rather than fight, he would pay ransom to the Danes in a system known as Danegeld. As part of the ransom, a peace treaty was drawn up that was intended to stop the raids. However, rather than buying the Vikings off, payment of Danegeld only encouraged them to come back for more.

The Dukes of Normandy were quite happy to allow these Danish adventurers to use their ports for raids on the English coast. The result was that the courts of England and Normandy became increasingly hostile to each other. Eventually, Æthelred sought a treaty with the Normans, and ended up marrying Emma, daughter of Richard I, Duke of Normandy in the Spring of 1002, which was seen as an attempt to break the link between the raiders and Normandy.

Then, on St. Brice's day in November 1002, Danes living in England were slaughtered on the orders of Æthelred.

Rise of Cnut 

In mid-1013, Sven Forkbeard, King of Denmark, brought the Danish fleet to Sandwich, Kent. From there he went north to the Danelaw, where the locals immediately agreed to support him. He then struck south, forcing Æthelred into exile in Normandy (1013–1014). However, on 3 February 1014, Sven died suddenly. Capitalising on his death, Æthelred returned to England and drove Sven's son, Cnut, back to Denmark, forcing him to abandon his allies in the process.

In 1015, Cnut launched a new campaign against England. Edmund fell out with his father, Æthelred, and struck out on his own. Some English leaders decided to support Cnut, so Æthelred ultimately retreated to London. Before engagement with the Danish army, Æthelred died and was replaced by Edmund. The Danish army encircled and besieged London, but Edmund was able to escape and raised an army of loyalists. Edmund's army routed the Danes, but the success was short-lived: at the Battle of Ashingdon, the Danes were victorious, and many of the English leaders were killed. Cnut and Edmund agreed to split the kingdom in two, with Edmund ruling Wessex and Cnut the rest.

In 1017, Edmund died in mysterious circumstances, probably murdered by Cnut or his supporters, and the English council (the witan) confirmed Cnut as king of all England. Cnut divided England into earldoms: most of these were allocated to nobles of Danish descent, but he made an Englishman earl of Wessex. The man he appointed was Godwin, who eventually became part of the extended royal family when he married the king's sister-in-law. In the summer of 1017, Cnut sent for Æthelred's widow, Emma, with the intention of marrying her. It seems that Emma agreed to marry the king on condition that he would limit the English succession to the children born of their union. Cnut already had a wife, known as Ælfgifu of Northampton, who bore him two sons, Svein and Harold Harefoot. The church, however, seems to have regarded Ælfgifu as Cnut's concubine rather than his wife. In addition to the two sons he had with Ælfgifu, he had a further son with Emma, who was named Harthacnut.

When Cnut's brother, Harald II, King of Denmark, died in 1018, Cnut went to Denmark to secure that realm. Two years later, Cnut brought Norway under his control, and he gave Ælfgifu and their son Svein the job of governing it.

Edward becomes king 
One result of Cnut's marriage to Emma was to precipitate a succession crisis after his death in 1035, as the throne was disputed between Ælfgifu's son, Harald Harefoot, and Emma's son, Harthacnut. Emma supported her son by Cnut, Harthacnut, rather than a son by Æthelred. Her son by Æthelred, Edward, made an unsuccessful raid on Southampton, and his brother Alfred was murdered on an expedition to England in 1036. Emma fled to Bruges when Harald Harefoot became king of England, but when he died in 1040 Harthacnut was able to take over as king. Harthacnut quickly developed a reputation for imposing high taxes on England. He became so unpopular that Edward was invited to return from exile in Normandy to be recognised as Harthacnut's heir, and when Harthacnut died suddenly in 1042 (probably murdered), Edward (known to posterity as Edward the Confessor) became king.

Edward was supported by Earl Godwin of Wessex and married the earl's daughter. This arrangement was seen as expedient, however, as Godwin had been implicated in the murder of Alfred, the king's brother. In 1051 one of Edward's in-laws, Eustace, arrived to take up residence in Dover; the men of Dover objected and killed some of Eustace's men. When Godwin refused to punish them, the king, who had been unhappy with the Godwins for some time, summoned them to trial. Stigand, the Archbishop of Canterbury, was chosen to deliver the news to Godwin and his family. The Godwins fled rather than face trial. Norman accounts suggest that at this time Edward offered the succession to his cousin, William (duke) of Normandy (also known as William the Conqueror, William the Bastard, or William I), though this is unlikely given that accession to the Anglo-Saxon kingship was by election, not heredity – a fact which Edward would surely have known, having been elected himself by the Witenagemot.

The Godwins, having previously fled, threatened to invade England.  Edward is said to have wanted to fight, but at a Great Council meeting in Westminster, Earl Godwin laid down all his weapons and asked the king to allow him to purge himself of all crimes. The king and Godwin were reconciled, and the Godwins thus became the most powerful family in England after the king. On Godwin's death in 1053, his son Harold succeeded to the earldom of Wessex; Harold's brothers Gyrth, Leofwine, and Tostig were given East Anglia, Mercia, and Northumbria. The Northumbrians disliked Tostig for his harsh behaviour, and he was expelled to an exile in Flanders, in the process falling out with his brother Harold, who supported the king's line in backing the Northumbrians.

Death of Edward the Confessor 

On 26 December 1065, Edward was taken ill. He took to his bed and fell into a coma; at one point he woke and turned to Harold Godwinson and asked him to protect the Queen and the kingdom. On 5 January 1066 Edward the Confessor died, and Harold was declared king. The following day, 6 January 1066, Edward was buried and Harold crowned.

Although Harold Godwinson had "grabbed" the crown of England, others laid claim to it, primarily William, Duke of Normandy, who was cousin to Edward the Confessor through his aunt, Emma of Normandy. It is believed that Edward had promised the crown to William. Harold Godwinson had agreed to support William's claim after being imprisoned in Normandy, by Guy of Ponthieu. William had demanded and received Harold's release, then during his stay under William's protection it is claimed, by the Normans, that Harold swore "a solemn oath" of loyalty to William.

Harald Hardrada ("The Ruthless") of Norway also had a claim on England, through Cnut and his successors. He had a further claim based on a pact between Harthacnut, King of Denmark (Cnut's son) and Magnus, King of Norway.

Tostig, Harold's estranged brother, was the first to move; according to the medieval historian Orderic Vitalis, he travelled to Normandy to enlist the help of William, Duke of Normandy, later to be known as William the Conqueror. William was not ready to get involved so Tostig sailed from the Cotentin Peninsula, but because of storms ended up in Norway, where he successfully enlisted the help of Harald Hardrada. The Anglo Saxon Chronicle has a different version of the story, having Tostig land in the Isle of Wight in May 1066, then ravaging the English coast, before arriving at Sandwich, Kent. At Sandwich Tostig is said to have enlisted and press ganged sailors before sailing north where, after battling some of the northern earls and also visiting Scotland, he eventually joined Hardrada (possibly in Scotland or at the mouth of the river Tyne).

Battle of Fulford and aftermath 

According to the Anglo Saxon Chronicle (Manuscripts D and E) Tostig became Hardrada's vassal and then with 300 or so longships sailed up the Humber Estuary bottling the English fleet in the river Swale and then landed at Riccall on the Ouse. They marched towards York, where they were confronted, at Fulford Gate, by the English forces that were under the command of the northern earls, Edwin and Morcar; the Battle of Fulford followed, on 20 September, which was one of the bloodiest battles of medieval times. The English forces were routed, though Edwin and Morcar escaped.  The victors entered the city of York, exchanged hostages and were provisioned. Hearing the news whilst in London, Harold Godwinson force-marched a second English army to Tadcaster by the night of the 24th, and after catching Harald Hardrada by surprise, on the morning of 25 September, Harold achieved a total victory over the Scandinavian horde after a two-day-long engagement at the Battle of Stamford Bridge. Harold gave quarter to the survivors allowing them to leave in 20 ships.

William of Normandy sails for England 

Harold would have been celebrating his victory at Stamford Bridge on the night of 26/27 September 1066, while William of Normandy's invasion fleet set sail for England on the morning of 27 September 1066. Harold marched his army back down to the south coast, where he met William's army, at a place now called Battle just outside Hastings. Harold was killed when he fought and lost the Battle of Hastings on 14 October 1066.

The Battle of Hastings virtually destroyed the Godwin dynasty. Harold and his brothers Gyrth and Leofwine were dead on the battlefield, as was their uncle Ælfwig, Abbot of Newminster. Tostig had been killed at Stamford Bridge. Wulfnoth was a hostage of William the Conqueror. The Godwin women who remained were either dead or childless.

William marched on London. The city leaders surrendered the kingdom to him, and he was crowned at Westminster Abbey, Edward the Confessor's new church, on Christmas Day 1066. It took William a further ten years to consolidate his kingdom, during which any opposition was suppressed ruthlessly; in a particularly brutal process known as the Harrying of the North, William issued orders to lay waste the north and burn all the cattle, crops and farming equipment and to poison the earth. According to Orderic Vitalis, the Anglo-Norman chronicler, over 100,000 people died of starvation. Figures based on the returns for the Domesday Book estimate that the population of England in 1086 was about 2.25 million, so 100,000 deaths, due to starvation, would have equated to 5 percent of the population.

By the time of William's death in 1087 it was estimated that only about 8 percent of the land was under Anglo-Saxon control. Nearly all the Anglo-Saxon cathedrals and abbeys of any note had been demolished and replaced with Norman-style architecture by 1200.

See also

Notes

Citations

References 

 
 
 
 
 
 
 
 
 
 
 
 
 
 
 
 
 
 Clark, David, and Nicholas Perkins, eds. Anglo-Saxon Culture and the Modern Imagination (2010)

Further reading

External links 
 Internet Medieval Source book
 C. P. Biggam's Anglo-Saxon Studies: A Select bibliography
 Anglo Saxon Era – articles about the period
 Prosopography of Anglo-Saxon England

01